SEPCO Electric Power Construction Corporation (commonly known as SEPCO) is a Chinese construction and engineering company that designs and builds power generation and transmission infrastructure.  SEPCO1 (SEPCOI) and SEPCO2 (SEPCO No. 2) are wholly owned subsidiaries.

By revenue, it is among the 100 largest construction contractors in the world in 2013. 

SEPCO built the Candiota power plant in Brazil.   Construction commenced in 2008 and it was successfully synchronized in 2010.

On the transmission side, it is constructing a US$650 million electricity transmission line in Zambia from the Maamba thermal power station, a project expected to be complete by 2015.

References

External links
SEPCO website
SEPCO1 website
SEPCO2 website

Manufacturing companies of China
Construction and civil engineering companies of China
Companies based in Shandong
Construction and civil engineering companies established in 1952
Chinese companies established in 1952